Michał Awdaniec (c. late 11th century - early 12th century) was a chancellor to king Bolesław III Wrymouth of the Kingdom of Poland around the years 1112-1113. He was likely the person who ordered or sponsored Gallus Anonymus's chronicle, Gesta principum Polonorum.

11th-century births
12th-century deaths
Chancellors of Poland
12th-century Polish people
11th-century Polish people
Patrons of literature